Aloa gangara is a moth of the family Erebidae. It was described by Charles Swinhoe in 1892. It is found in northern and western Australia, including the state of Victoria.

References

Moths described in 1892
Spilosomina
Moths of Australia